Sometimes Good is a 1934 British comedy film directed by W. P. Kellino and starring Henry Kendall, Nancy O'Neil and Minnie Rayner. The screenplay concerns a shopgirl who pretends to be a Colonel's daughter, meets a man and falls in love with him, but is worried about telling him who she really is.

Cast
 Henry Kendall ...  Paul Everard
 Nancy O'Neil ...  Millie Tarrant
 Minnie Rayner ...  Jessica Mallory
 Hal Gordon ...  Michael Trout
 Charles Mortimer ...  John Everard
 Madeline Seymour ...  Mrs. Everard
 Jimmy Godden ...  Colonel Mortimer
 Edna Davies ...  Ella Tyfield
 Gladys Jennings ...  Mrs. Smyth-Jenkins

References

External links

1934 films
1934 comedy films
1930s English-language films
Films directed by W. P. Kellino
British comedy films
British black-and-white films
Films shot at British International Pictures Studios
1930s British films